Earle Parkhill Scarlett (June 27, 1896 − June 14, 1982) was a Canadian physician. He served as Chancellor of the University of Alberta from 1952 to 1958.

Scarlett was born in Manitoba in 1896. He attended the University of Manitoba and earned a BA in 1916. He served in World War I with the Canadian Machine Gun Corps. He then attended medical school at the University of Toronto and practiced as a physician in the United States before moving to Calgary.

Dr. E.P. Scarlett High School in Calgary is named after him.

References

1896 births
1982 deaths
University of Manitoba alumni
Canadian military personnel from Manitoba
University of Toronto alumni
Canadian military personnel of World War I
Canadian Machine Gun Corps soldiers
Chancellors of the University of Alberta